The Osborne School was a racially-segregated public school for African-American children on 1726 Douglas Street in Lake Worth Beach, Florida. 

The building was constructed in 1948 and used as a school until 1971. In 1971 Osborn was the last school in Florida to be integrated after the United States Supreme Court ordered the end of segregation in 1969. In 1980 the building was repurposed as a community education center. The building remains at 1718 S. Douglas ST, Lake Worth, FL.

References

Lake Worth Beach, Florida
Buildings and structures in Lake Worth Beach, Florida
Historically segregated African-American schools in Florida
1948 establishments in Florida
1971 disestablishments in Florida
Defunct public schools in Palm Beach County, Florida
Defunct black public schools in the United States that closed when schools were integrated